De Pere High School (DPHS) is a public high school located in De Pere, Wisconsin. Founded in 1870, it serves students in grades 9 through 12. It is the only high school in the Unified School District of De Pere.

History 

Until 1870, schooling for all grades in De Pere, Wisconsin was held in one building; starting in 1870, a high school was located in a stone building on the corner of James Street and Wisconsin Street. During the back half of the 1890s, plans were made for a new high school at the corner of Chicago Street and Broadway. A fire ravaged the stone school on February 20, 1900; it was demolished in 1906 after sitting dormant. After spending the rest of the term at the local German Benevolent Society Hall, the school located at Chicago and Broadway opened in fall 1900. It was quickly nicknamed the "Castle School" or "Castle on the Hill" due to its architecture and topographic situation. In 1978, the current high school was built at 1700 Chicago Street. It underwent major expansion in 2001, with the addition of a gymnasium and several classrooms. In January 2007, more classrooms were added. In 2017, De Pere High School underwent another small expansion. De Pere High School's mascot is the Redbird.

In 2005, the school received a cease-and-desist order on the grounds that its mascot was copyrighted material of Illinois State University. The school eventually redesigned the logo so as to not violate the copyright.

In 2016, Newsweek included DPHS on its list of best high schools for low-income students.

Demographics 
The school is 90 percent white, three percent Hispanic, two percent black, two percent Asian, and one percent American Indian.

Extracurricular activities

FIRST Robotics 
De Pere High school is home to FIRST robotics Team 1716. The team, which has been in existence since 2006, offers students the opportunity to gain hands-on knowledge in STEM fields.

During the 2006 season Team 1716 had a win-lose-tie record of 6-7-1. In the 2007–09 seasons, Team 1716 had records of 3-6-0, 1-6-1 and 1-7-0. In the 2010 season, Team 1716 had a 7-4-1 record in Breakaway. The team had a 7-5-1 record in the 2011 season. The 2012 Season (Rebound Rumble) was the best in Team 1716 history, with a record of 6-5-0. They finished as the #4 seed, but were eliminated in the quarterfinals. Team 1716 also received the Judge's Award. In the 2013 and 2014 seasons, Redbird Robotics did not make it to the elimination rounds. In 2014, the team participated in more than one regional for the first time since the team's inception.

Athletics 
De Pere High School is a member of the Fox River Classic Conference, and its athletic teams are nicknamed the Redbirds. Redbird athletic teams had been a member of the Bay Conference. De Pere's last season in the Bay was 2006-2007. The girls swimming team absorbs swimmers from the smaller, crosstown West De Pere High School while still competing under the De Pere Redbirds banner. The school contributes to the ten-school cooperative Bay Area Ice Bears girls hockey team, which plays in the Eastern Shores Conference.

In 2014, the school announced a new synthetic turf football field, a new baseball diamond and soccer field, and upgrades to the existing softball diamond. In late 2019, the school revealed plans for a $3 million renovation of its football stadium, which would add 600 seats to the home grandstand and establish a permanent 500-seat visitors grandstand.

Performing arts 
The school fields two show choirs, Chicago Street Singers and Jam Session. In 2020, the school hosted a show choir competition, "Destination De Pere: Let's Jam!", and while event organizers claimed it was the first one hosted at De Pere, the school hosted a competition named "Big Jam" from 1996 to 1999. The school also offers a musical and plays through its Drama Club.

Notable alumni 
 Deb Baker, mystery author
 Jerry Daanen, professional football player
 Terry Meeuwsen, 1973 Miss America
 Drew Nowak, professional football player
 Elyse Bennett, professional soccer player
 Brevin Pritzl, professional basketball player

References

External links
De Pere High School website
"Crimson Aviator" newspaper
"Redbird TV" - De Pere High School TV news program

Educational institutions established in 1870
1870 establishments in Wisconsin
Public high schools in Wisconsin
Schools in Brown County, Wisconsin
De Pere, Wisconsin